Silver City is a census-designated place (CDP) in the mountainous area of central Tulare County, California. It lies 72 km ENE of Visalia, California, within the boundary of Sequoia National Park. The 2010 United States census reported Silver City was uninhabited.

Silver City is the name of an inholding in Sequoia National Park located at Mile 21 on the 25-mile road to Mineral King. It consists of 58 fee-simple lots, 39 of which have cabins on them, plus a commercial area consisting of a store, restaurant and several rental cabins called the Silver City Mountain Resort. It is classified as a transient non-community because it is occupied only during the spring, summer and fall but not during the winter.

Geography

According to the United States Census Bureau, the CDP covers an area of 0.6 square miles (1.5 km), all of it land.

History

Archaeological evidence indicates that the area surrounding Silver City has supported indigenous peoples for thousands of years. A Yokuts tribe called Wukchumni established permanent campsites along the Kaweah River in the lower elevations below Silver City. During the hot summers, these people moved to the higher elevations, thus becoming the first users of the Silver City area. They traded with the Monache and the Numic peoples who came over the Sierras from the eastern side in hunting and foraging movements.

The first settler of the modern historical era homesteaded Silver City in 1856; Hale Tharp. In 1858 Tharp’s brother-in-law, John Swanson, erected a dwelling there. For several subsequent years, valley ranchers used the alpine areas during the summer heat, allowing their cattle to graze there.

By 1873, sufficient metal ore had been identified in the nearby mountains to cause a minor gold rush. Although short-lived, it consolidated Mineral King and Silver City into viable summertime communities.

References

Census-designated places in Tulare County, California
Populated places in the Sierra Nevada (United States)